The Flatrock River, also known as Flatrock Creek and other variants of the two names, is a  tributary of the East Fork of the White River in east-central Indiana in the United States.

The Flatrock River rises near Mooreland in northeastern Henry County, and flows generally southwestwardly through Rush, Decatur, Shelby and Bartholomew counties, past the communities of Lewisville, Rushville and St. Paul.  It joins the Driftwood River at Columbus to form the East Fork of the White River.  The New Hope Bridge and Pugh Ford Bridge span the river in Bartholomew County, Indiana.

In Decatur County it collects the Little Flatrock River, which rises in Rush County and flows southwestwardly , past Milroy.

Variant names
The United States Board on Geographic Names settled on "Flat Rock River" as the stream's name in 1917, and changed it to "Flatrock River" in 1959.  According to the Geographic Names Information System, it has also been known historically as "Big Flat Rock River," "Big Flatrock River," "Flat Rock Creek," and "Flatrock Creek."

See also
List of Indiana rivers

References

Rivers of Indiana
Rivers of Bartholomew County, Indiana
Rivers of Decatur County, Indiana
Rivers of Henry County, Indiana
Rivers of Rush County, Indiana
Rivers of Shelby County, Indiana
Tributaries of the Wabash River